Meelis Peitre (born 27 March 1990) is an Estonian footballer who plays for Paide Linnameeskond III, as a left back.

Career
Born Tallinn, Peitre has played club football for Warrior Valga, Flora, Flora II, Paide Linnameeskond and Keila.

He made his international debut for Estonia in 2011.

References

External links

1990 births
Living people
Footballers from Tallinn
Estonian footballers
Estonia international footballers
FC Warrior Valga players
FC Flora players
Paide Linnameeskond players
Keila JK players
Association football fullbacks